Mikhail Vasilievich Pletnev (Mikha'il Vas'ilevič Plet'nëv; born 14 April 1957) is a Russian pianist, conductor and composer.

Life and career

Pletnev was born into a musical family in Arkhangelsk, then part of the Soviet Union.  His father played and taught the bayan, and his mother was a pianist.  He studied with Kira Shashkina for six years at the Special Music School of the Kazan Conservatory, before entering the Moscow Central Music School at the age of 13, where he studied under Evgeny Timakin. In 1974, he entered the Moscow Conservatory, studying under Yakov Flier and Lev Vlassenko. At age 21, he won the Gold Medal at the VI International Tchaikovsky Competition in 1978, which earned him international recognition and drew great attention worldwide.  The following year he made his debut in the United States.  He also taught at the Moscow Conservatory.  Pletnev has acknowledged Sergei Rachmaninoff as a particularly notable influence on him as a musician.

In 1988, Pletnev was invited to perform at the superpower conference in Washington, D.C., where he met and befriended Mikhail Gorbachev. From this friendship, he gained the support to found two years later the Russian National Orchestra in 1990, the first non-government-supported orchestra in Russia since 1917, and became its first principal conductor. He and the orchestra made their recording debut on Virgin Classics, releasing Tchaikovsky's Sixth Symphony and Marche Slave in 1991.  He stepped down as Principal Conductor in the late 1990s, but remained the orchestra's artistic director.

Pletnev has made a number of recordings with Deutsche Grammophon. His recordings are mostly of Russian works, though in 2007 he recorded the complete Beethoven symphonies. The first works he recorded were for orchestra, including Tchaikovsky's The Sleeping Beauty, his Sixth Symphony and Manfred Symphony, and Rachmaninoff's Second and Third Symphonies. Pletnev's recording of Tchaikovsky's First Symphony (Winter Daydreams) received critical acclaim.

In July 2010, Pletnev, a resident of Thailand, was arrested by Thai authorities in connection with allegations of child molestation. Pletnev, who was released on bail, denied the charges.  He cancelled appearances at the BBC Proms and the Edinburgh International Festival in order to prepare his defense, but the charges were dropped on 28 September.

Awards and recognitions
 1978: Gold Medal and First Prize Tchaikovsky Competition Moscow
 1999: Echo Klassik (Skrjabin)
 2002: State Prize First Class of the Russian Federation by President Vladimir Putin
 2005: Grammy Awards of 2005 Best Chamber Music Performance with Martha Argerich
 2006: State Prize First Class of the Russian Federation for the year 2005 by President Vladimir Putin

Notable compositions
 1978: Quintet for Piano, Flute, Violin, Viola and cello
 1979: "Triptych" for Symphony Orchestra
 1985: Capriccio for Piano and Orchestra
 1988: Classical Symphony
 1997: Viola Concerto
 2000: Variations on a theme by Rachmaninov
 2000: Adagio for five Double basses
 2006: Cello sonata
 2006: Fantasia Elvetica (First performance: December 9, 2006 Orchester Musikkollegium Winterthur Switzerland; Mikhail Pletnev, Conductor; Sascha und Mischa Manz)
 2009: Jazz suite

Transcriptions
 1976: Rodion Konstantinovich Shchedrin: 2 Concert Pieces from „Anna Karenina“ (Transcription for piano)
 1978 (?): Pyotr Ilyich Tchaikovsky: The Nutcracker, The Sleeping Beauty (Transcriptions for piano)
 2003: Sergei Sergeyevich Prokofiev: Suite from Cinderella op. 87 (Transcription for two pianos)

Honours and awards
 Lenin Komsomol Prize (1978) – for high performance skills
 Glinka State Prize of the RSFSR (1982) – for concert programs (1978–1981)
 Russian Federation State Prize in Literature and Art:
 7 December 1993 – for concert programs of the Russian National Symphony Orchestra in recent years
 27 May 1996 – for the creation and execution of the Jubilee Music Festival "Alfred Schnittke Festival" (1994, Moscow), Third and Fourth Symphonies, the Concerto for Viola and Orchestra, Concert number 2 for Cello and Orchestra, Concerto Grosso № 5, three spiritual choruses ("Hail Mary Hail," "Jesus Christ" "Our Father"), the cantata "The History of Dr. Johann Faust,"
 9 June 2006 – for outstanding technical skill and innovation in the field of musical art, which opened a new chapter in national and world culture
 Order of Merit for the Fatherland;
 Prize of the President of the Russian Federation in the field of art and literature in 2001 (30 January 2002)
 47th Grammy Awards (2005) – best chamber music performance

Selected discography 
 
 Shostakovich Symphonies 4 & 10. Russian National Orchestra. PENTATONE PTC 5186647 (2018).
 Tchaikovsky Selections. Peter Ilyich Tchaikovsky. Coronation March / Capriccio Italien / Francesca da Rimini / Romeo and Juliet / Slavonic March. Mikhail Pletnev, Russian National Orchestra. PENTATONE PTC 5186550 (2016).
 Alexander Scriabin  - Symphony No. 1 & The Poem of Ecstasy. Mikhail Pletnev, Svetlana Shilova, Mikhail Gubsky, Vladislav Lavrik, Norbert Gembaczka, Alexander Solovyev, Russian National Orchestra, Chamber Choir of the Moscow Conservatory. PENTATONE PTC 5186514 (2015).
 Peter Ilyich Tchaikovsky The Symphonies and Manfred. Mikhail Pletnev, Russian National Orchestra. PENTATONE PTC 5186489 (2015).
 Peter Ilyich Tchaikovsky.  Manfred Symphony. Mikhail Pletnev, Russian National Orchestra. PENTATONE PTC 5186387 (2014).
 Dmitri Shostakovich - Symphony No.15 & Hamlet. Mikhail Pletnev, Russian National Orchestra. PENTATONE PTC 5186331 (2009).
 Nikolai Rimsky-Korsakov Orchestral Suites. Mikhail Pletnev, Russian National Orchestra. PENTATONE PTC 5186362 (2010).
 Maurice Ravel & Serge Prokofiev - Piano Concertos & Schlimé - 3 Improvisations. Mikhail Pletnev, Francesco Tristano Schlimé, Russian National Orchestra. PENTATONE PTC 5186080 (2006)
 Dmitri Shostakovich - Symphony No. 11 "The Year 1905" Mikhail Pletnev, Russian National Orchestra. PENTATONE PTC 5186076 (2006).
 Peter Ilyich Tchaikovsky Symphony No. 1 in G Minor, Op. 13 "Winter Daydreams" Marche Slave Op. 31. Mikhail Pletnev, Russian National Orchestra. PENTATONE PTC 5186381 (2012).
 Peter Ilyich Tchaikovsky Symphony No. 2 in C Minor Op. 17 "Little Russian" Symphony No. 2 in C Minor. Mikhail Pletnev, Russian National Orchestra. PENTATONE PTC 5186382 (2012).
 Peter Ilyich Tchaikovsky Symphony No.3 in D Major, Op.29 Coronation March. PENTATONE PTC 5186383 (2012).
 Peter Ilyich Tchaikovsky Symphony No. 4 in F minor Op. 36 Romeo and Juliet. Mikhail Pletnev, Russian National Orchestra. PENTATONE PTC 5186384 (2011).
 Peter Ilyich Tchaikovsky Symphony No.5 in E minor, Op.64 Francesca da Rimini, Op.32. Mikhail Pletnev, Russian National Orchestra. PENTATONE PTC 5186385 (2011).
 Peter Ilyich Tchaikovsky Symphony No.6 in B minor, Op.74 "Pathétique" Capriccio italien, Op.45. Mikhail Pletnev, Russian National Orchestra. PENTATONE PTC 5186386 (2011).
 Sergei Taneyev - At the reading of a psalm. Mikhail Pletnev, Lolita Semenina, Marianna Tarassova, Mikhail Gubsky, Andrei Baturkin, Vladislav Tchernushenko, Russian National Orchestra. PENTATONE PTC 5186038 (2004).
 Johann Sebastian Bach, Domenico Scarlatti, Ludwig van Beethoven, Frédéric Chopin. Recital of Mikhail Pletnev (2019)

References

Further reading
 Ludmila Kokoreva: Michail Pletnyov. Moskau 2003,  (Russian)
 Lora Tokareva: Muzykal'nye Otkrytiya Mikhaila Pletneva. Etudy Nabroski Interview, Moskau 2009,  (Russian)

External links
 Russian National Orchestra biography of Mikhail Pletnev
 A more detailed biography
 Sikorski Music Publishers page on transcription by Pletnev of suite from Prokofiev's ballet Cinderella

Interviews
 Mikhail Pletnev interview, October 27, 2000

Russian classical pianists
Male classical pianists
Russian composers
Russian male composers
Grammy Award winners
State Prize of the Russian Federation laureates
Recipients of the Order "For Merit to the Fatherland", 3rd class
Prize-winners of the International Tchaikovsky Competition
Recipients of the Lenin Komsomol Prize
Glinka State Prize of the RSFSR winners
People's Artists of the RSFSR
Kazan Conservatory alumni
Moscow Conservatory alumni
1957 births
Living people
21st-century Russian conductors (music)
Russian male conductors (music)
21st-century Russian male musicians